Miniophyllodes aurora is a species of moth of the  family Erebidae. It is found in northern Madagascar.

This species has a wingspan of 72 mm.

References

Erebidae
Moths of Madagascar
Moths of Africa